Antony Wilks Burgess AC, FAA (born 1946) is an Australian biochemist and a cancer researcher. He has been Director of the Ludwig Institute for Cancer Research in Melbourne and Professor of Surgery at the Royal Melbourne Hospital, University of Melbourne since 1980. He was elected a Fellow of the Australian Academy of Science (FAA) in 1993, and in 1998 he was appointed a Companion of the Order of Australia (AC) "for outstanding services to science and medicine, especially in the field of cancer research".

References

Companions of the Order of Australia
Fellows of the Australian Academy of Science
Living people
1946 births
Australian biochemists
Fellows of the Australian Academy of Technological Sciences and Engineering